Samuel Anderson (born 27 April 1982) is an English actor. He played Crowther in The History Boys, Danny Pink in the BBC sci-fi series Doctor Who and Daniel in the Sky1 sitcom Trollied.

Early life
Anderson was born in Handsworth, Birmingham, to an Irish mother and Jamaican father. From early life, Anderson made it clear that he wished to pursue acting as a career. He attended Stuart Bathurst, a Catholic secondary school.

Career
Anderson attended the Academy of Live and Recorded Arts in London before going on to originate the role of Crowther in the 2004 National Theatre production of Alan Bennett's play The History Boys. He subsequently performed the same role in the Broadway, Sydney, Wellington, and Hong Kong productions, and radio and film versions.

On television, Anderson has appeared in Hex for Sky One in 2004, and Totally Frank for Channel 4 in 2006–2007.  In 2007, he appeared in the BBC Three comedy series Gavin & Stacey as recurring character Fingers. He made another appearance in the show in 2009. He has also appeared in the BBC Four comedy film Stuck, and made various guest appearances in Doctors and Casualty on BBC One.

From October 2007, Anderson starred in the ITV1 soap opera Emmerdale as Ross Kirk. His casting in the role was announced in September 2007, with Anderson stating that it was "great" to be joining "such a successful show". Emmerdale series producer Kathleen Beedles stated that Anderson was "a fantastic addition to the cast". Anderson remained a series regular in Emmerdale until January 2009, with major storylines including his character having an affair with Donna Windsor-Dingle and his wrongful imprisonment for the murder of Shane Doyle.

Anderson played Mr. Romantic in a Carte Noire coffee advertising campaign in 2011. He also featured in an advertising campaign for Ginsters in 2012. In February 2014, he had a small role in an episode of BBC drama series Death in Paradise. Also in February 2014, it was announced that Anderson had been cast as recurring character Danny Pink, a teacher at Coal Hill School, in the eighth series of Doctor Who, and he appeared in 11 episodes. Between 2014 and 2017, Anderson appeared in Sky1 sitcom Trollied, playing the role of Daniel. In February 2016, he appeared in the BBC One drama series Moving On. In 2017, he starred in the comedy Loaded on Channel 4.

He starred as William on the Netflix science fiction series Another Life, which released its two seasons in 2019 and 2021. It was canceled in February 2022.

Filmography

Film

Television

References

External links
 
 

1982 births
English people of Irish descent
English people of Jamaican descent
English male film actors
English male stage actors
Male actors from Birmingham, West Midlands
English male soap opera actors
English male radio actors
Black British male actors
Alumni of the Academy of Live and Recorded Arts
Living people
People from Handsworth, West Midlands
21st-century English male actors